Church of Vytautas the Great or the Church of the Assumption of the Blessed Virgin Mary is a Roman Catholic church in the Old Town of Kaunas, Lithuania, and is the oldest church in the city and an important example of Gothic architecture in Lithuania, having the only Gothic cross-shaped plan (with side chapels) in Lithuania.

History

The church was built on the north bank of the Neman River around 1400 for Franciscan friars and foreign merchants. It was ordered and funded by Vytautas the Great as a commendation to the Blessed Virgin Mary for saving his life after a major defeat in the Battle of the Vorskla River.

Being quite close to the river the church has suffered many times from spring floods. In 1812 it was burned by French troops. The Franciscan friary was closed by Russian administration after the November Uprising. In 1845, the Catholic church was closed and later was rebuilt and reopened as an Orthodox church. From 1903 it served as military barracks. In 1915 Germans organised a warehouse here. The building returned to the Catholic Church in 1919 and  underwent major renovation works in 1931–1938, and again in 1978–1982.

Architecture
The church was constructed in Gothic style and is an example of the Lithuanian Brick Gothic architecture. The church layout of the Latin cross is unique in the Lithuanian Gothic. Over the years the ground level around the church has been raised significantly and the façades became lower; to compensate for this, the windows were shortened and the side portals were removed. The bell tower was added later and has probably  been used to guide ships navigating the Neman River.

Lithuanian writer Juozas Tumas-Vaižgantas (1869–1933) is buried in the crypt of the church.

References

External links

Official website
Image gallery from the church's website

Churches completed in 1400
15th-century Roman Catholic church buildings in Lithuania
Roman Catholic churches in Kaunas
Brick Gothic
Gothic architecture in Lithuania